Guyana competed in the 2014 Commonwealth Games in Glasgow, Scotland from July 23 to August 3, 2014.

Athletics

Men
Track & road events

Key
Note–Ranks given for track events are within the athlete's heat only
Q = Qualified for the next round
q = Qualified for the next round as a fastest loser or, in field events, by position without achieving the qualifying target
NR = National record
N/A = Round not applicable for the event

Boxing

Men

Women

Cycling

Road
Men

Women

Track
Points Race

Scratch

Shooting

Open

Squash

Individual

Doubles

Swimming

Women

Table Tennis

Singles

Doubles

Team

Qualification Legend: Q=Main Bracket (medal); qB=Consolation Bracket (non-medal)

References

Nations at the 2014 Commonwealth Games
Guyana at the Commonwealth Games
Common